The 2019 Swiss Cup Zürich took place on November 3 in Zürich, Switzerland.  It was the 32nd iteration of the event.

Participants

Results

Prelims 

 the team advanced to the semi-finals

Semi-finals 

 the team advanced to the finals

Finals

References 

2019 in gymnastics
2019 in Swiss sport